Moonshine Highway is a 1996 American thriller-drama made-for-TV-movie written, produced, and directed by Andy Armstrong. It stars Kyle MacLachlan, Randy Quaid, and Maria del Mar. It was broadcast in the United States by Showtime on 5 May 1996.

The film has been described as a recent example in a tradition of popular cultural depictions of moonshiners as "noble renegades" of the backwoods South (also found in 1958's Thunder Road).

Plot
Set in the 1950s, in backcountry Tennessee, the story focuses on Jed Muldoon (Kyle MacLachlan), a World War II veteran who smuggles illegal corn whiskey in his modified Lincoln.

Muldoon is having an affair with Ethel Miller (Maria del Mar), whose husband is the corrupt, local sheriff Wendell Miller (Randy Quaid). Sheriff Miller is under pressure from federal agent Bill Rickman (Alex Carter) to arrest the moonshiners.

Cast
 Kyle MacLachlan as Jed Muldoon
 Randy Quaid as Sheriff Miller
 Maria del Mar as Ethel Miller
 Alex Carter as Bill Rickman
 Gary Farmer as Hooch Wilson
 Jeremy Ratchford as Dwayne Dayton
 Les Carlson as Pappy
 Dennis Fitzgerald as Clancy Clayton
 Raliegh Wilson as Claude Clayton
 Michael Copeman as Ol Man Clayton
 Jody Racicot as Haywood Possum
 Rick Roberts as Travis Saunders
 Lori Hallier as Rose
 Eleanor Joy Lind as Waitress Lorna
 Dick Callahan as Moody
 Doug Lennox as Parker
 David Cronenberg as Clem Clayton
 Beau Starr as Dale Lister
 Andy Armstrong as Bill Meyers
 Stuart Hughes as Stopwatch Man
 J. Winston Carroll as Ned the Barman
 Todd William Schroeder as Deputy Clyde
 Mike Lee as Deputy #2
 Jason Deline as Grocery Boy (uncredited)

Production
Moonshine Highway was filmed in Ontario, Canada: in Markham; Mississauga; New Tecumseth; Pickering; Scarborough; Toronto; and Whitchurch-Stouffville.

Home media

It was first released on videotape on 6 August 1996. It later was released on DVD in Argentina in May 2008.

See also
 Moonshine in popular culture

References

External links
 
 
 
 

1996 television films
1990s crime drama films
1996 crime thriller films
American crime drama films
American crime thriller films
Adultery in films
Films about automobiles
American chase films
Films scored by Steve Dorff
Films set in the 1950s
Films set in Tennessee
Films set in Appalachia
Films shot in Toronto
1990s English-language films
Showtime (TV network) original programming
1996 drama films
1996 films
Moonshine in popular culture
American drama television films
1990s American films